Preti Mangimi was a professional continental road bicycle racing team based in Italy, which participated in UCI Europe Tour and when selected as a wildcard to UCI ProTour events. The team was managed by former World Road Race champion Marino Basso. Alberto Elli and Leonardo Levati were directeur sportifs with the team. One of the riders of the team Russian Boris Shiplevsky was the first wearer of the leader of the UCI Europe Tour in 2008. Financial problems forced the team to fold after just one season, when no cosponsor could be found.

Final roster

References

External links 
Cyclingnews.com team for 2008

Cycling teams based in Italy
Defunct cycling teams based in Italy
Cycling teams established in 2007
Cycling teams disestablished in 2008
2007 establishments in Italy
2008 disestablishments in Italy